QRA may refer to:

 Quantile regression averaging, in econometrics and forecasting
 Quantitative risk assessment, an estimation of risk
 Quaternary Research Association, associated with the Journal of Quaternary Science
 Queensland Regional Airlines, a defunct Australian airline
 Quick Reaction Alert, a NATO state of readiness in military aviation
 Rand Airport (IATA airport code: QRA), South Africa

See also
 QRA locator, an obsolete geographic coordinate system